The Redfern Fokker Dr.1 is a full size replica of the Fokker Dr.I triplane for homebuilt construction.

Design and development
The Refern Fokker Dr.1 is a single engine triplane with conventional landing gear. The aircraft plans were developed by the Walter Redfern Company using Peter M. Bowers' triplane plans, Smithsonian plans and original plans from Reinhold Platz, a member of the original German design team for the Dr.1.

Specifications (Redfern Fokker Dr.1)

References

Homebuilt aircraft
Replica aircraft
Fokker Dr.1